Marvel Heroes may refer to:
Marvel Heroes (board game)
Marvel Heroes (video game)
Marvel's ABC television series

See also
Marvel Super Heroes (disambiguation)